Raebern Brooks Hitchcock Jr (born June 20, 1965) is a former American football offensive lineman in the National Football League (NFL) for the Washington Redskins.  He played college football at the University of Minnesota and attended Saint Paul Johnson High School.

Hitchcock currently serves as the offensive line coach at Cretin-Derham Hall High School.

References

1965 births
Living people
American football centers
Minnesota Golden Gophers football players
Washington Redskins players
High school football coaches in Minnesota
Players of American football from Saint Paul, Minnesota